Carl and Hillway station is a light rail stop on the Muni Metro N Judah line, located in the Inner Sunset neighborhood of San Francisco, California. The station opened with the N Judah line on October 21, 1928. Trains stop at marked poles; there are no platforms or shelters. The stop is not accessible to people with disabilities.

A crossover is located at the stop, allowing outbound trains to be switched back inbound. In September 2016, Muni began running a pair of one-car shuttles between Embarcadero station and Carl and Hillway during morning rush hour to reduce crowding on the inner section of the line. A study after one month showed the shuttles had increased capacity on the inner part of the line by 18% and reduced the number of passengers unable to board overcrowded trains by 63%.

References

External links 
SFMTA – Carl St & Hillway Ave inbound and outbound
SF Bay Transit (unofficial) – Carl St & Hillway Ave

Muni Metro stations
Sunset District, San Francisco
Railway stations in the United States opened in 1928